This is a list of Hispanic/Latino Americans who are or were judges, magistrate judges, court commissioners, or administrative law judges. If known, it will be listed if a judge has served on multiple courts.

Other topics of interest 

 List of first minority male lawyers and judges in the United States
 List of first women lawyers and judges in the United States
 List of African-American jurists
 List of Asian American jurists
List of Jewish American jurists
List of LGBT jurists in the United States
List of Native American jurists

References